Namalycastis is a genus of polychaetes belonging to the family Nereididae.

The genus has almost cosmopolitan distribution.

Species:

Namalycastis abiuma 
Namalycastis arista 
Namalycastis borealis 
Namalycastis brevicornis 
Namalycastis caetensis 
Namalycastis elobeyensis 
Namalycastis fauveli 
Namalycastis geayi 
Namalycastis glasbyi 
Namalycastis hawaiiensis 
Namalycastis indica 
Namalycastis intermedia 
Namalycastis jaya 
Namalycastis kartaboensis 
Namalycastis longicirris 
Namalycastis macroplatis 
Namalycastis meraukensis 
Namalycastis multiseta 
Namalycastis nicoleae 
Namalycastis nipae 
Namalycastis rhodochorde 
Namalycastis rigida 
Namalycastis senegalensis 
Namalycastis siolii 
Namalycastis terrestris 
Namalycastis vivax

References

Phyllodocida
Polychaete genera